Thetis Mound is a hill in the North Slope Borough, of Alaska, United States.

Thetis Mound is a type of hill known as a pingo.

References 

Hills of Alaska
Landforms of North Slope Borough, Alaska